The 2021–22 season was FC Zürich's 126th season in existence and the club's fifth consecutive season in the top flight of Swiss football. In addition to the domestic league, Zürich participated in this season's editions of the Swiss Cup.

Players

First-team squad

Out on loan

Pre-season and friendlies

Competitions

Overall record

Swiss Super League

League table

Results summary

Results by round

Matches
The league fixtures were announced on 24 June 2021.

First half of season

Second half of season

Swiss Cup

References

External links
 

FC Zürich seasons
Zürich
Swiss football championship-winning seasons